Bernice Jane Orwig (born November 24, 1976) is an American water polo goalkeeper who won a silver medal at the 2000 Summer Olympics.

Early career
Bernice graduated from Savanna High School in Anaheim, California, in June 1994. There she began her career in water polo playing as goalie for the Savanna Rebel Water Polo team.

College career
Orwig played for USC. As a senior in 1999, she won the NCAA. That same year, she won the Peter J. Cutino Award as the top female college water polo player in the United States. She received first team All-America honors in 1999 and second team All-America honors during her sophomore and junior year. She graduated from USC with a B.A. degree in Social Studies Education.

Managerial career
In addition to her career as a player, Orwig is also a water polo coach. In March 2005, she was named as an assistant coach for the USA National Team. In January 2005, Orwig coached the Junior National Team. The team won the gold medal at the 2005 Junior World Championships. She has also served as an assistant coach for the University of California, Berkeley, the University of Michigan, and USC. In 2005, she became an assistant coach of the women's water polo team at Golden West College in Huntington Beach, California, and helped coach them to a state championship in 2009.

See also
 United States women's Olympic water polo team records and statistics
 List of Olympic medalists in water polo (women)
 List of women's Olympic water polo tournament goalkeepers

External links
 

1976 births
Living people
American female water polo players
Water polo goalkeepers
Water polo players at the 2000 Summer Olympics
Medalists at the 2000 Summer Olympics
Olympic silver medalists for the United States in water polo
USC Trojans women's water polo players
USC Trojans women's water polo coaches
American water polo coaches
Michigan Wolverines women's water polo coaches
California Golden Bears women's water polo coaches
USC Rossier School of Education alumni
20th-century American women